This is a list of singles that have peaked in the top 10 of the French Singles Chart in 2021. 77 singles were in the top 10 this year which 16 were on the number-one spot.

Top 10 singles

Entries by artists

The following table shows artists who achieved two or more top 10 entries in 2021. The figures include both main artists and featured artists and the peak position in brackets.

See also
2021 in music
List of number-one hits of 2021 (France)

References

Top
France top 10
Top 10 singles in 2021
France 2021